Conditional logistic regression is an extension of logistic regression that allows one to take into account stratification and matching. Its main field of application is observational studies and in particular epidemiology. It was devised in 1978 by Norman Breslow, Nicholas Day, Katherine Halvorsen, Ross L. Prentice and C. Sabai. It is the most flexible and general procedure for matched data.

Motivation
Observational studies use stratification or matching as a way to control for confounding. Several tests existed before conditional logistic regression for matched data as shown in  related tests. However, they did not allow for the analysis of continuous predictors with arbitrary stratum size. All of those procedures also lack the flexibility of conditional logistic regression and in particular the possibility to control for covariates.

Logistic regression can take into account stratification by having a different constant term for each stratum. Let us denote  the label (e.g. case status) of the th observation of the th stratum and  the values of the corresponding predictors. Then, the likelihood of one observation is

where  is the constant term for the th stratum. While this works satisfactorily for a limited number of strata, pathological behavior occurs when the strata are small. When the strata are pairs, the number of parameters grows with the number of observations   (it equals ). The asymptotic results on which maximum likelihood estimation is based on are therefore not valid and the estimation is biased. In fact, it can be shown that the unconditional analysis of matched pair data results in an estimate of the odds ratio which is the square of the correct, conditional one.

Conditional likelihood
The conditional likelihood approach deals with the above pathological behavior by conditioning on the number of cases in each stratum and therefore eliminating the need to estimate the strata parameters. In the case where the strata are pairs, where the first observation is a case and the second is a control, this can be seen as follows

With similar computations, the conditional likelihood of a stratum of size , with the  first observations being the cases, is 

where  is the set of all subsets of size  of the set .

The full conditional log likelihood is then simply the sum of the log likelihoods for each stratum. The estimator is then defined as the  that maximizes the conditional log likelihood.

Implementation
Conditional logistic regression is available in R as the function clogit in the survival package. It is in the survival package because the log likelihood of a conditional logistic model is the same as the log likelihood of a Cox model with a particular data structure.

Related tests
 Paired difference test allows to test the association between a binary outcome and a continuous predictor while taking into account pairing.
 Cochran-Mantel-Haenszel test allows to test the association between a binary outcome and a binary predictor while taking into account stratification with arbitrary strata size. When its conditions of application are verified, it is identical to the conditional logistic regression score test.

Notes

Logistic regression